"Wrong Crowd" is a song by British singer-songwriter Tom Odell and the first single from his second studio album of the same name. It was released digitally on 4 April 2016. Odell had previously debuted the song live at a show in Cologne, Germany in 2015, but did not formally announce its title until early 2016, when he teased the release of the single through social media.

Music video 
The music video for "Wrong Crowd" was released along with the single on 4 April 2016. It was directed by George Belfield and filmed in South Africa. The video begins with Odell watching a video of himself singing "Constellations", a track from his upcoming album, to a woman. As the music begins, Odell is seen lounging in his hotel room, drinking alone and getting dressed for the evening. Later shots in the video show Odell partying in a nightclub, surrounded by people and being showered with champagne.

Live performances
Odell premiered the song for the first time at a show during the C/O Pop Festival in Cologne in 2015. On 4 April 2016, Odell announced that he would be going on tour, performing at venues in Europe and the United States in support of both the song and upcoming album.

Track listing

Release date

References

2016 songs
Tom Odell songs
Songs written by Tom Odell
Songs written by Rick Nowels
RCA Records singles